Paradinandra suecica is a species of fossil plants from the Cretaceous of Sweden. It is of uncertain placement within the order Ericales, and was described in 2001.

Biostratigraphy
The specimens of Paradinandra had been naturally fusanised (turned into charcoal), and were recovered by sieving sand and clay. The deposits are thought to be of Late Santonian to Early Campanian age, and are located in a former kaolin quarry owned by Höganäs AB near Näsum, Skåne, Sweden. The specimens were described by Jürg Schöneberger and Else Marie Friis in 2001 in the American Journal of Botany, and have been deposited at the Swedish Museum of Natural History.

Description
The flowers are organised into whorls of five parts. The sepals are free, lanceolate, and have as obtuse tip. They bear trichomes along the median vein, and become much thinner away from the thickened centre. The petals are thought to be fused together, at least at their bases; they are shaped like a bishop's mitre. Each flower has 15 stamens, which may also be united at the base, and taper towards the attachment of the anther. This results in the anthers falling into three distinct layers in the bud. It is not known whether the difference is retained on flowering. The gynoecium bears three styles, and the ovules are curved.

Affinities
In their original description, Schöneberger and Friis noted that the flowers had few features which would allow them to determine the relationships of Paradinandra to other plants. The stamen arrangement seen in Paradinandra and the curved ovules are both seen in various families within the Ericales (sensu lato), and some families, such as Ternstroemiaceae, show both. This suggests that closest relatives of Paradinandra are found among the order Ericales, but the authors could not assign the fossil to any single family, and therefore assigned it incertae sedis (of uncertain placement) within the order.

References

Further reading

Enigmatic angiosperm taxa
Prehistoric angiosperm genera
Fossil taxa described in 2001
Monotypic Ericales genera